The Battle of Bourgaon, or Mount Bourgaon was an engagement between troops of the Byzantine Empire and Berber rebels in North Africa. It marked the end of the first stage of the revolt.

Background 
After the Byzantine annexation of the Vandalic Kingdom in 534 a group of Berber chieftains in North Africa, rebelled against the Byzantines in hope of carving out their own kingdoms and taking back modern day Tunisia and Algeria from the new overlords. The most important of these chieftains were Kutzinas, Esdilasas, Mesdinissas, and Iourphoutes. In 534, they ambushed Byzantine commanders Aigan and Rufius, and killed them both. In 535, a Byzantine expedition defeated the Berber rebels at the Battle of Mammes. The Berbers retreated, and attempted to regroup at Mount Bourgaon, while the Byzantines pursued them.

The battle 
Setting up their camp, Solomon observed the Berber positions. The Berbers were encamped on the mountain. The eastern slope of the mountain was very steep, while the western had a gentle slope. Thus the Berbers, not expecting the Byzantines to actually try and overtake them from the east, concentrated all their forces on the west. The Byzantine troops were demoralized when met with the larger number of enemies, but after a speech by Solomon, they gained their bravery back, and prepared for the fight. He sent his commander, Theodorus, with about 1,000 excubitors to take advantage of the Berber positions, and climb the eastern side of the mountain to ambush the Berbers. Not even telling his own troops to avoid being betrayed, the excubitors climbed up the mountain during the dead of the night without being noticed. By dawn Solomon moved his troops up to the outskirts of the mountain, and by morning the troops of Theodorus showed themselves as well. Both detachments started a relentless attack against the surrounded Berber troops who panicked and attempted to flee, but had nowhere to do so. The few that survived did so by trampling over the dead bodies of their comrades, and nearly all of the Berber warriors were caught, killed, or wounded. All of the Berber chieftains were able to flee except for Esdilasas, who was caught, and taken prisoner. According to Procopius, the Berbera suffered 50,000 casualties, while the Romans suffered none, although this was likely an exaggeration.

Aftermath 
Following the battle and the decisive defeat of the Berbers, the chieftains scattered and fled. Cutzinas, the main leader of the revolt, fled to the Berber Kingdom of Arris led by king Iabdas, and continued to wage guerilla style warfare from there. In 536 Solomon attempted to defeat Iabdas, but had to retreat after suffering attrition and fearing betrayal. In 540 he was able to temporarily overtake the kingdom through a campaign which saw Iabdas flee his kingdom, but this was short lived, and soon a much major revolt formed led by Antalas.

References 

Battles involving the Byzantine Empire
6th century in Africa
Military history of Tunisia
530s conflicts